Juan Manuel Celaya Hernández (born 1 September 1998) is a Mexican diver. He participated at the 2019 World Aquatics Championships, winning a medal. He also competed in the men's synchronized 3 meter diving event at the 2021 Olympic Games held in Tokyo, where he placed fourth alongside partner Yahel Castillo.

References

External links
 LSU Tigers bio

1998 births
Living people
Mexican male divers
World Aquatics Championships medalists in diving
Pan American Games medalists in diving
Pan American Games gold medalists for Mexico
Pan American Games silver medalists for Mexico
Divers at the 2019 Pan American Games
Medalists at the 2019 Pan American Games
Divers at the 2020 Summer Olympics
Olympic divers of Mexico
LSU Tigers divers
21st-century Mexican people
20th-century Mexican people